Fabio Ferraresi (born 24 May 1979) is an Italian footballer

Career
In the late 1990s he was signed by Aston Villa and appeared in several pre-season friendlies. It was noted during this time that he was notable for his ungentlemanly play-acting and gesticulative behaviour. He failed to make an impression on the Villa management.

In July 2009, he was signed by Valle del Giovenco.

References

External links
 AIC profile 
 

1979 births
Living people
Sportspeople from the Province of Pesaro and Urbino
Italian footballers
Association football midfielders
Expatriate footballers in England
Expatriate footballers in Switzerland
Italian expatriate sportspeople in Switzerland
Italian expatriate sportspeople in England
Italian expatriate footballers
Aston Villa F.C. players
A.C. ChievoVerona players
Calcio Lecco 1912 players
U.S. Avellino 1912 players
FC Chiasso players
A.S.D. Martina Calcio 1947 players
Delfino Pescara 1936 players
Footballers from Marche
People from Fano